David Charles Esquer (born April 13, 1965) is an American college baseball coach. He is the head coach of the Stanford Cardinal baseball team. He previously served as head coach of the California Golden Bears baseball team from 2000–2017.

Early life and education
Esquer attended Palma High School in Salinas, California where he played basketball, football, and baseball. Esquer was team captain and MVP of the baseball team and was named his high school's athlete of the year. He attended Stanford University and was a starting shortstop for Stanford Cardinal baseball under head coach Mark Marquess and as a senior helped Stanford win the 1987 College World Series, in which he was named to the all-tournament team for hitting .350 with six RBI.

Professional playing career
After graduating from Stanford with a bachelor's degree in economics and a master's degree in sociology in 1987, Esquer played three seasons in the minor league organizations of the Baltimore Orioles, California Angels, and Milwaukee Brewers.

Coaching career
In 1991, Esquer returned to Stanford to become an assistant coach at Stanford under Marquess. After six seasons at Stanford, from 1997 to 1999, Esquer was an assistant coach at Pepperdine handling recruiting, hitting instruction, infield coaching, and third base coach duties.

Beginning in the 2000 season, Esquer was hired as head baseball coach at Cal. In 18 seasons with the Golden Bears, Esquer recorded a record of 525–467–2 (.529), and led the Bears to NCAA Regionals in 2001, 2008, 2010, and 2015, and was named Pacific-10 Conference coach of the year in 2001. In 2011, Esquer led the Bears back to their first College World Series appearance since 1992 and was named national baseball coach of the year by the National Collegiate Baseball Writers Association.

On June 16, 2017, Esquer stepped down from his position at Cal to accept the head baseball coaching position at Stanford, his alma mater.

Head coaching record
The following is a table of Esquer's yearly records as an NCAA head baseball coach.

Personal life
Esquer and his wife Lynn have two children, Gabrielle and Xavier.

See also
List of current NCAA Division I baseball coaches

References

1965 births
Living people
California Golden Bears baseball coaches
Pepperdine Waves baseball coaches
Stanford Cardinal baseball coaches
Stanford Cardinal baseball players
Sportspeople from Salinas, California
Baseball shortstops
Baseball coaches from California